Vertigo is the fourth album by American alternative rock group Jump, Little Children, released in 2001 after being dropped by Atlantic Records.

Track listing
All songs written by Jay Clifford, except where noted.
"Vertigo" – 4:00
"Angeldust (Please Come Down)" – 4:22
"Too High" – 4:19
"Hold Your Tongue" – 4:30
"Lover's Greed" – 4:27
"Yearling" – 3:58
"Mother's Eyes" – 7:26
"Come Around" – 4:39
"Words of Wisdom" (Evan Bivins) – 3:56
"The House Our Father Knew" (Evan Bivins, Clifford) – 4:04
"Made It Fine" – 3:51
"Overkill" – 3:26
"Singer" (Matthew Bivins) – 4:36
"Pigeon" – 4:26

Personnel
Evan Bivins – drums & percussion
Jonathan Gray – upright bass, backing vocals
Matthew Bivins – accordion, harmonica, mandolin, tin whistle, keyboard, vocals
Jay Clifford – vocals, guitars, piano
Ward Williams – cello, guitar, backing vocals
Michael Bellar – piano, Hammond organ
Lenny Castro – Percussion Quartet Illumina

Chart positions

References

2001 albums
Jump, Little Children albums
Albums produced by Brad Wood